Tokihiko is a masculine Japanese given name.

Possible writings
Tokihiko can be written using different combinations of kanji characters. Some examples:

時彦, "hour, elegant boy"
時比古, "hour, young man (archaic)"
刻彦, "engrave, elegant boy"
晨彦, "morning, elegant boy"
期彦, "period, elegant boy"
登喜彦, "climb up, rejoice, elegant boy"
登紀彦, "climb up, chronicle, elegant boy" 

The name can also be written in hiragana ときひこ or katakana トキヒコ.

Notable people with the name
, Japanese volleyball player
, Japanese manga artist
, Japanese silent film actor

Japanese masculine given names